The Hornby Baronetcy, of Brookhouse in the Parish of Saint Michael, Blackburn, in the County Palatine of Lancaster, was a title in the Baronetage of the United Kingdom. It was created on 21 February 1899 for William Hornby, commonly known as Harry Hornby, who was for many years a Conservative Member of Parliament for Blackburn. His father, William Henry Hornby (1805–1884), had been a successful industrialist and a Conservative parliamentarian, holding a Blackburn seat from 1857 to 1865;  his brother Edward Hornby held a seat in Blackburn from 1869 to 1874.

The title became extinct on the death of the second Baronet, Henry Russell Hornby, in 1971.

Hornby baronets, of Brookhouse (1899)

Sir William Henry Hornby, 1st Baronet (1841–1928)
Sir Henry Russell Hornby, 2nd Baronet (1888–1971)

References

Extinct baronetcies in the Baronetage of the United Kingdom